Yuko Mitsuya (三屋　裕子 Mitsuya Yūko, born July 29, 1958) is a former volleyball player from Japan, who was a member of the Japan Women's National Team that won the bronze medal at the 1984 Summer Olympics.

National team
 1982: 4th place in the World Championship
 1984: 3rd place in the Olympic Games of Los Angeles

External links
 official blog

1958 births
Volleyball players at the 1984 Summer Olympics
Olympic volleyball players of Japan
Olympic bronze medalists for Japan
Living people
Japanese women's volleyball players
Olympic medalists in volleyball
Asian Games medalists in volleyball
Volleyball players at the 1982 Asian Games
Medalists at the 1984 Summer Olympics
Medalists at the 1982 Asian Games
Asian Games silver medalists for Japan